The Pajama Game is a Broadway musical.

"The Pajama Game" may also refer to:
 The Pajama Game (film), a 1957 movie based on the Broadway musical
 The Pajama Game (album), a 1957 Doris Day album based on the movie 
 The Pajama Game cast recording, the 2006 Broadway cast recording from The Pajama Game, disc one on Harry Connick, Jr.'s album Harry on Broadway, Act I